The 2015–16 Continental Cup was the 19th edition of the IIHF Continental Cup, Europe's second-tier ice hockey club competition organised by International Ice Hockey Federation. The season started on 2 October 2015 and the Super Final was played on 8–10 January 2016. Dragons de Rouen won the competition for the second time and also qualified for the 2016–17 Champions Hockey League.

Qualified teams

First round

Group A
The Group A tournament was played in Belgrade, Serbia from 2–4 October 2015 with all games held at the Pionir Ice Hall.

Second round

Group B
The Group B tournament was played in Miskolc, Hungary from 23–25 October 2015 with all games held at the Miskolc Arena.

Group C
The Group C tournament was played in Tychy, Poland from 23–25 October 2015 with all games held at the Tychy Winter Stadium.

Third round
Third round games will be played on 20–22 November 2015. The top-two ranked teams of each third round group will be promoted for the Super final.

Group D
The Group D tournament is being played in Asiago, Italy from 20–22 November 2015.

Group E
The Group E tournament is being played in Rouen, France from 20–22 November 2015.

Super final

Super final was played in Rouen, France on 8–10 January 2016.

Final group

See also

 2016–17 Champions Hockey League

References

External links
 Official IIHF tournament page

IIHF Continental Cup
2015–16 in European ice hockey